The Lordville–Equinunk Bridge is a girder bridge that connects Lordville, New York with Equinunk, Pennsylvania, United States over the Delaware River. The current structure opened on July 24, 1992, five and a half years after the previous suspension bridge was demolished after quick deterioration.

History 

In 1850, George Lord was granted a license to operate a ferry over the Delaware River on this site. In time, the area outgrew the ferry and planned a bridge. This bridge was designed by E. F. Harrington of the John A. Roebling's Sons company as a wire suspension bridge with wooden towers. It opened on January 1, 1870 and was destroyed by flood on October 10, 1903. It was replaced by an eye-bar suspension bridge which opened June 4, 1904. This second bridge lasted until February 1984 when it was closed due to an undermined pier, which caused one tower to lean and the bridge to sag. The bridge was demolished on November 24, 1986. Construction of the replacement bridge started in May 1991, and the new bridge opened in 1992.

The current bridge is the furthest crossing upstream after the Delaware River converges from the east and west branches at Hancock, New York.

See also
List of bridges documented by the Historic American Engineering Record in New York (state)
List of bridges documented by the Historic American Engineering Record in Pennsylvania
List of crossings of the Delaware River
New York–Pennsylvania Joint Interstate Bridge Commission

References

Bibliography

External links

Bridges over the Delaware River
Bridges in Wayne County, Pennsylvania
Bridges in Delaware County, New York
Former toll bridges in New York (state)
Former toll bridges in Pennsylvania
Girder bridges in the United States
Historic American Engineering Record in New York (state)
Historic American Engineering Record in Pennsylvania
Road bridges in New York (state)
Road bridges in Pennsylvania
New York–Pennsylvania Joint Interstate Bridge Commission